The Somali Navy is the naval warfare service branch of the Somali Armed Forces. During the post-independence period, the Somali Navy mostly did maritime patrols so as to prevent ships illegally infringing on the nation's maritime borders. The Somali Navy and Somali Air Force also regularly collaborated. In addition, the Somali Navy carried out Search and Rescue (SAR) missions.

History
The Somali Navy was founded in 1964 with the help of Soviet military advisers. It had its bases in Berbera, on the Gulf of Aden and Kismayo on the Indian Ocean near the border with Kenya. It also operated a radar facility in Merca. Its inventory consisted of Soviet-made patrol craft. In 1977, Siad Barre terminated the Treaty of Friendship and Cooperation with Moscow and expelled all Soviet military advisers from Somalia due to their intervention in the Ogaden War.

In 1990 the naval inventory included two Soviet Osa-II missile-armed fast attack craft, four Soviet Mol PFT torpedo-armed fast attack craft, and several patrol craft. The navy also possessed a Soviet Polnocny-class landing ship capable of carrying five tanks and 120 soldiers, and four smaller landing craft.

The Navy dissolved as Barre's regime fell in 1990–91; there are reports that some vessels took refuge in Aden.

Re-establishment 
In June 2009, the Somali navy was re-established with a new commander appointed: Admiral Farah Omar Ahmed.

Up to 500 naval personnel were training in Mogadishu, with their training expected to finish in December 2009. They were reported as the first batch of a 5000 strong navy force. Admiral Farrah Ahmed Omaar told a New Yorker reporter in December 2009 that the navy was 'practically nothing' at the time, though five hundred new recruits were in training.

It was said by Admiral Omar that the recruits were being paid $60 per month.

A Somali delegation visiting Turkey in August 2011 submitted a request for two search-and-rescue ships and six coast guard boats. Worth some 250 million euros, if approved, the request might have turned the new Somali navy into a stronger naval force, capable of curbing piracy and protecting its coastline.

In August 2011 a Transitional Federal Government-Puntland cooperative agreement called for the creation of a Somali Marine Force.

On 30 June 2012, the United Arab Emirates announced a contribution of $1 million toward enhancing Somalia's naval security. Boats, equipment and communication gear necessary for the rebuilding of the coast guard would be bought. A central operations naval command was also planned to be set up in Mogadishu.

On 23 January 2020, it was announced that the Turkish Naval Forces donated several patrol vessels and amphibious vessels to the Somali Navy as a form of military aid to Somalia and to carry on its commitment to the nations joint task force.

In July 2020, it was reported that China and the Somali Navy were planning to Conduct joint naval patrols in the waters including Somaliland’s coast.

Ships and equipment

Current equipment

Inventory circa 1970s 
The following was the Somali Navy's major equipment:

Ranks and uniform 

Somali Navy personnel wear camouflage uniforms but with black shoulder boards to identify them as Navy men. They also wear black berets to identify them as such, their service uniform is white, and they traditionally wear black ties alongside a white blazer, shirt, trousers, belts and if their rank allows, golden laces on their dress uniforms and black laces on their regular service dress and black gorget patches with more golden ornate design for flag officers and black formal shoes, however in more recent years, a high collar variant is worn by more junior officers who graduate from Camp TURKSOM's Navy Academy, also Rear Admirals and Commodore Admirals may have a red stripe at the bottom of their shoulder boards (similarly to those in the Yemeni Navy) to identify them as staff officers, also the Navy also utilises sleeve rank insignia. There is also khaki uniforms utilised by the Navy with them retaining the black shoulder boards, lace and berets, although officers may wear a peaked cap.

Ranks 

Officers

Enlisted

See also

References

Navies by country
Military of Somalia
Military units and formations established in 1965